Giuseppe Vitucci (4 October 1950 – 25 January 2018) was an Italian wrestler. He competed in the men's Greco-Roman 82 kg at the 1976 Summer Olympics.

References

1950 births
2018 deaths
Italian male sport wrestlers
Olympic wrestlers of Italy
Wrestlers at the 1976 Summer Olympics
Sportspeople from Bari